Floriade is an international exhibition and garden festival, held every 10 years in the Netherlands. All have been World Horticultural Expositions and listed as an A1 category exhibition by the International Association of Horticultural Producers and hence recognised by the Bureau International des Expositions. The most recent of them, Floriade 2022, was held in Almere.

History
Prior to the Floriade in the Netherlands, flower and garden shows were called Flora Exhibitions held at Groenendaal park in Heemstede in 1925, 1935 and 1953, and earlier in 1910 in the Haarlemmerhout  in Haarlem. The first Floriade was held in Rotterdam in Het Park with the Euromast observation tower being erected to mark the event.

Organization
The Floriade is coordinated by the Dutch Horticultural Council. The Dutch Horticultural Council was founded in 1908 and aims to strengthen the image of the Dutch horticulture and to promote exports. The location varies and is awarded to a city after a bidding phase.

Editions

Recent Floriades

1992 Zoetermeer
The 1992 Floriade was held in Zoetermeer and ran from 9 April to 10 October. The event was held on converted pasture outside the newtown of Zoetermeer, covered 168 acres and had participants from more than 20 countries.

2002 Haarlemmermeer
The 2002 Floriade was held in Haarlemmermeer with a theme of Contribution of Horticulture in the quality of life in the 21st century. It ran from 5 April to 20 October, covered 65 ha and had 30 participating countries

2012 Venlo Floriade
The Floriade 2012 was held from 5 April to 7 October 2012, in Venlo. The sixth Floriade and nineteenth AIPH world horticultural exposition, the Floriade spanned 66 acres and hosted 25 countries.

2022 Almere
The Floriade 2022 has been held in Almere with the masterplan designed by MVRDV.

Further reading

References

External links
 Official site 
 BIE dedicated Page 

1960 establishments in the Netherlands
Entertainment events in the Netherlands
Garden festivals in the Netherlands
International horticultural exhibitions
Festivals established in 1960